Selina Ssubi Katumba (born 27 June 2003) is a Ugandan swimmer. She competed in the women's 100 metre freestyle at the 2019 World Aquatics Championships.

Major results

Individual

Long course

Short course

Relay

Long course

References

2003 births
Living people
Ugandan female swimmers
Place of birth missing (living people)
Ugandan female freestyle swimmers
Female backstroke swimmers
Female butterfly swimmers